World Central Kitchen (WCK) is a not-for-profit non-governmental organization devoted to providing meals in the wake of natural disasters. Founded in 2010 by chef José Andrés, the organization prepared food in Haiti following its devastating earthquake. Its method of operations is to be a first responder and then to collaborate and galvanize solutions with local chefs to solve the problem of hunger, immediately following a disaster.

Disaster relief 

Since its founding, the NGO has organized meals in the Dominican Republic, Nicaragua, Zambia, Peru, Cuba, Uganda, The Bahamas, Cambodia, Ukraine, and the United States.

Puerto Rico Hurricane Maria response 
José Andrés emerged as a leader of the disaster relief efforts in Puerto Rico in the wake of Hurricane Maria in 2017. His efforts to provide assistance encountered obstacles from FEMA and government bureaucrats, so instead, "we just started cooking." He organized a grass-roots movement of chefs and volunteers to establish communications, food supplies, and other resources and started serving meals. Andrés and his organization World Central Kitchen (WCK) served more than two million meals in the first month after the hurricane. WCK received two short term FEMA contracts and served more meals than the Salvation Army or the Red Cross, but its application for longer-term support was denied. WCK developed resiliency centers on the island, and installed a hydropanel array at a greenhouse in San Juan to provide safe drinking water.

For his efforts in Puerto Rico, Andrés was named the 2018 Humanitarian of the Year by the James Beard Foundation. He wrote a book about the experience called We Fed an Island: The True Story of Rebuilding Puerto Rico, One Meal at a Time.

2017–2019 events 

In August 2017, WCK coordinated efforts with the American Red Cross and working in Houston, Texas following Hurricane Harvey. WCK operated in Southern California in Ventura County during the December 2017 Thomas Fire to assist firefighters and first responders and provided food to families affected by the fires.

A kitchen to serve the Hawaiian communities affected by a volcanic eruption in June 2018 was set up. In September 2018, WCK worked in South Carolina in the aftermath of Hurricane Florence. In November 2018, WCK and Andrés teamed up with chefs Guy Fieri, and Tyler Florence, and local Sierra Nevada Brewing Company to bring Thanksgiving dinner to 15,000 Camp Fire survivors in Butte County, California.

In January 2019, WCK and Andrés opened a restaurant on Pennsylvania Ave, Washington, DC, to feed federal workers that were furloughed during the government shutdown. In September 2019, WCK and Andrés opened kitchens in The Bahamas to feed people in the wake of Hurricane Dorian. In October they helped in Sonoma County, California, working with local chefs such as Guy Fieri, during the Kincade Fire.

2020–present 
In early March 2020, the Grand Princess cruise ship was under quarantine near San Francisco due to the COVID-19 pandemic. WCK in collaboration with Bon Appetit Management Company (a division of Compass Group), fed thousands of stranded passengers for approximately a week while logistics were being figured out. Over 50,000 meals were served during this crisis.

In mid-March 2020, Andrés transformed eight of his New York City and Washington, D.C., restaurants into soup kitchens to support customers affected by the COVID-19 crisis.

In late March 2020 in the San Francisco Bay Area, WCK collaborated with Frontline Foods in order to provide an open-sourced effort to deliver meals from local restaurants to local hospital staff, many of which have been negatively affected by the COVID-19 closures. It later assumed responsibility and management of the Frontline Foods operation.

During April 2020, Andrés partnered with the Washington Nationals and World Central Kitchen to use the team's stadium in Washington, DC, as a kitchen and distribution facility for free meals.

In late February 2022, Andrés and World Central Kitchen responded to multiple locations, including in border areas and in hard-hit Kharkiv, Ukraine, to distribute meals during the 2022 Russian invasion of Ukraine. By March 2, 2022, WCK has opened 8 kitchens on the Poland–Ukraine border.

In February 2023, World Central Kitchen set up mobile kitchens throughout Turkey and Syria following the 2023 Turkey–Syria earthquake.

Recognition 
 For his work with WCK, José Andrés won the 2018 James Beard Foundation Award for Humanitarian of the Year.
 Recognizing his work with WCK, José Andrés was named one of the world's 100 most influential people by Time in 2018.
 For his work with WCK, José Andrés won the 2021 Princess of Asturias Award, in the category "Concord".
 For his work with WCK, José Andrés received a 2021 Courage and Civility Award from Jeff Bezos

See also

References

External links 
 
 
 
 Think Food Group

Humanitarian aid organizations
Charities based in Washington, D.C.
Hunger relief organizations
Organizations established in 2010
2010 establishments in Washington, D.C.